Mean Streets – No Bridges is an album by guitarist Jimmy Ponder that was released by Muse in 1987.

Reception 

In his review on AllMusic, Ron Wynn called it "prototype Ponder; soul jazz and blues played with energy and a slick, yet resourceful conviction" stating "Ponder has never gotten the profile or the exposure he deserves; he doesn't use gimmicks or crank up the volume, but his tasty fills, clever riffs, and crisp, bluesy solos are always worthwhile".

Track listing 
All compositions by Jimmy Ponder except where noted
 "Next Time You See Me" – 4:15
 "(They Long to Be) Close to You" (Burt Bacharach, Hal David) – 4:46
 "Time After Time" (Jule Styne, Sammy Cahn) – 5:04
 "Mean Streets-No Bridges" – 6:50
 "Solitude" (Duke Ellington, Eddie DeLange, Irving Mills) – 7:15
 "I Only Have Eyes for You" (Harry Warren, Al Dubin) – 4:35	
 "After the Rain" (John Coltrane) – 5:06

Personnel 
Jimmy Ponder – guitar, vocals
Bill Saxton – tenor saxophone, flute
Big John Patton – organ 
Geary Moore – rhythm guitar (tracks 2 & 4) 
Greg Bandy – drums

References 

Jimmy Ponder albums
1987 albums
Muse Records albums
Albums recorded at Van Gelder Studio